is a Hong Kong based Japanese actress and former member of the Japanese-Korean girl group Girls Kingdom.

Filmography

Film
 Summer Love Love (夏日戀神馬), (2011)
 Lan Kwai Fong 2 (喜愛夜蒲) – "Maxim", (2012)
 The Best Plan Is No Plan (溝女不離三兄弟) – "Lulu", (2013)
 Undercover Duet (猛龍特囧), (2015)
 The Mermaid (美人魚) – "George's Assistant", (2016)
 Deception of the Novelist (作家的謊言：筆忠誘罪) – "Elaine Chen", (2019)

Television
 Good Food, Trendy Food (食德好‧潮食男女) – self, (2013)
 The Crossing Hero (超級大英雄), (2015)
 Sakura Maruko (櫻桃小丸子) – "Noguchi Aiko", (2017)

References

1996 births
21st-century Japanese actresses
Living people
J-pop singers
Japanese film actresses
Japanese television actresses
Japanese women musicians
Hong Kong film actresses